Claudenus is a genus of ascidian tunicates in the family Pyuridae.

Species within the genus Claudenus include:
 Claudenus antipodus (Kott, 1972)

Species names currently considered to be synonyms:
 Claudenus antipoda (Kott, 1972): synonym of Claudenus antipodus (Kott, 1972) 
 Claudenus appendiculata (Heller, 1877): synonym of Molgula appendiculata Heller, 1877

References

Stolidobranchia
Tunicate genera